Xi people may refer to:

Xianbei
Xibe people
Kumo Xi, ancient Mongolic people, steppes people located in current northeast China
Ancient relative of Kamboja people of Cambodia and India